Chicon is the name given to seven Worldcons and retroactively applied to an eighth Worldcon. All eight of the conventions were held in Chicago, Illinois.

 Chicon I, 1940
 TASFIC (a.k.a. Chicon II), 1952
 Chicon III (a.k.a. Chicon II, confusingly enough), 1962
 Chicon IV, 1982
 Chicon V, 1991
 Chicon 2000, 2000
 Chicon 7, 2012
 Chicon 8, 2022